Tố Hữu (4 October 1920 – 9 December 2002) was a Vietnamese revolutionary poet  and politician. He published seven collections of poems, the first of which was the 1946 collection entitled Từ ấy (Thenceforth), which included many of his most popular and influential works that were written between 1937 and 1946. Following the establishment of the Democratic Republic of Vietnam, he became a prominent figure in the ruling Communist Party of Vietnam.

Biography
Tố Hữu, whose real name is Nguyễn Kim Thành, was born 4 October 1920 in Hoi An, Quang Nam province, as the youngest son of the family. At the age of 9, he and his father returned home and lived in Phu Lai village, now in Quang Tho commune, Quang Dien district, Thua Thien province. His father was a poor scholar, could not earn a living and struggled to earn a living, but he liked poetry, liked collecting proverbs and folk songs. He taught To Huu to write old poems. His mother was also the daughter of a scholar, knew many folk songs of Hue and loved him very much. His parents helped to nourish the soul of To Huu poetry. In 1938 he met a teacher, who had given him the pseudonym "Tố Hữu", taken from Đỗ Thị's sentence which means "big willpower available in my son". Tố Hữu accepted this name but interpreted it as a "pure friend". His mother died when he was 12 years old. At the age of 13, he entered Hue National University. Here he was directly exposed to the ideas of Marx, Engels, Lenin, Gorky, ... and approached through books, combined with the mobilisation of members of the Communist Party of Vietnam (Le Duan, Phan Dang Luu, Nguyen Chi Dieu) soon communist ideals. In 1936 he joined the Indochina Democratic Youth Union. In 1938 he was admitted to the Indochina Communist Party. In April 1939, he was arrested, tortured and exiled to Thua Phu Prison (Hue) and transferred to Lao Bao Prison (Quang Tri) and many other prisons in the Central Highlands. In March 1942, he escaped from the prison Đắc Glêi (now in Kon Tum), went to Thanh Hóa and contacted the party (through his secret activities in the district Hậu Lộc, Thanh Hoa province). In 1945, when the August Revolution broke out, he was elected Chairman of the Rebellion Committee of Thua Thien-Hue.

Tố Hữu moved quickly and successfully through what became the Communist Party of Vietnam. During the pre-unification period (before 1975) Tố Hữu was most influential in setting cultural policy in North Vietnam, especially in deciding the bounds of what was permissible for intellectuals and artists to publish and perform during this tightly controlled period. His control of intellectual and artistic production was matched only by Trường Chinh and Hồ Chí Minh himself. Intellectual discontent with this control was expressed by the poet Lê Đạt who, during the Nhân Văn affair, declared that Tố Hữu considered writers and artists petty bourgeois elements, and regarded literature as a mere tool of politics. As an example, he mentioned the case of Nam Cao whom Tố Hữu compelled to write a work on the rural taxation system, a topic with which the writer was by no means familiar.

He continued to hold many important party and government posts, including member of the Politburo, Secretary of the Central Committee, Deputy Chairman of the Council of Ministers  (as the government cabinet was then called), and the same post that was later renamed Deputy Prime Minister.

As the leader of the cultural section, he was named as the chief instigator of the persecution of intellectuals during the Nhân Văn affair. However, according to the musician Văn Cao, one of the prominent victims, the main author of this policy was Trường Chinh, the general secretary of the communist party at that time. According to Văn Cao, Tố Hữu, as a poet, was not sufficiently hard-hearted to pursue such a policy on his own. (See the article at the Vietnamese Wikipedia).

During his career, Tố Hữu was awarded the Gold Star Order, the 60-year membership badge, and the Hồ Chí Minh Award, the highest award for literary and artistic accomplishments conferred by the Vietnamese state. 

Tố Hữu enjoyed a steep rise in the party and government culminating in an equally steep and precipitous decline. He was blamed for the disastrous 1985 attempt at monetary reform and the ruinous inflation that resulted from its unsuccessful implementation. Inflation had risen 700% by 1986. Tố Hữu had to step down from his position as deputy prime minister and played no further political role in Vietnam. Despite his political fall from grace, Tố Hữu remained the Communist Party's poet-laureate. He died in 2002, at the age of 80.

List of main works

Từ ấy (Henceforth) (1946), 72 poems
Việt Bắc (Viet Bac) (1954), 26 poems
Gió lộng (Windy) (1961), 25 poems
Ra trận (Head to war) (1962-1971), 35 poems
Máu và Hoa (Blood and Flowers) (1977), 13 poems
Một tiếng đờn (A sound of music) (1992), 74 poems
Ta với ta (Me with myself) (1999)

List of popular poems

Bác ơi (Uncle)
Bà má Hậu Giang (Mother Hau Giang)
Bài ca xuân 1961 (The song of Spring 1961)
Bài ca quê hương (Homeland song)
Bầm ơi! (Mommy)
Con cá chột nưa (Fish and vegetables)
Có thể nào yên? (Could it be okay?)
Đi đi em! (Go, brother!)
Em ơi... Ba Lan (Honey ... Poland)
Gặp anh Hồ Giáo (Meet Ho Giao)
Hai đứa trẻ (Two children)
Hồ Chí Minh (Ho Chi Minh)
Hãy nhớ lấy lời tôi (Remember my words)
Hoa tím (Purple flowers)
Hoan hô chiến sĩ Điện Biên (Hooray Dien Bien soldiers)
Kính gửi cụ Nguyễn Du (To Nguyen Du)
Khi con tu hú (When the gowk calls)
Lao Bảo (Lao Bao)
Lạ chưa (Strange)
Lượm (Luom)
Mẹ Suốt (Mother Suot)
Mẹ Tơm (Mother Tom)
Mồ côi (Orphan)
Một tiếng đờn (A sound of music)
Miền Nam (South)
Mưa rơi (Rain falling)
Năm xưa (The old year)
Nước non ngàn dặm (Thousands of miles across country)
Sáng tháng Năm (May's morning)
Emily, con ơi (Emily, my daughter)
Ta đi tới (Let's go)
Ta với ta (Me with myself)
Tạm biệt (Goodbye)
Từ ấy (Henceforth)
Tâm tư trong tù (Confidant in prison)
Tương tri (Understand each other)
Theo chân Bác (Follow Uncle)
Tiếng chổi tre (The sound of bamboo brooms)
Tiếng hát sông Hương (Singing on the Perfume River)
Tiếng ru (Lullaby)
Với Lênin (With Lenin)
Vườn nhà (Home garden)
Việt Bắc (Viet Bac)
Việt Nam máu và hoa (Vietnam blood and flower)
Xuân đang ở đâu... (Where is spring)
Xuân đấy (That Spring)

See also
History of Vietnam

References

 New York Times, obituary, December 11, 2002.

1920 births
2002 deaths
S.E.A. Write Award winners
Vietnamese male poets
Date of birth missing
Date of death missing
Place of death missing
Alternates of the 4th Politburo of the Communist Party of Vietnam
Members of the 4th Politburo of the Communist Party of Vietnam
Members of the 5th Politburo of the Communist Party of Vietnam
Members of the 2nd Secretariat of the Workers' Party of Vietnam
Members of the 3rd Secretariat of the Workers' Party of Vietnam
Members of the 4th Secretariat of the Communist Party of Vietnam
Alternates of the 2nd Central Committee of the Workers' Party of Vietnam
Members of the 2nd Central Committee of the Workers' Party of Vietnam
Members of the 3rd Central Committee of the Workers' Party of Vietnam
Members of the 4th Central Committee of the Communist Party of Vietnam
Members of the 5th Central Committee of the Communist Party of Vietnam
Deputy Prime Ministers of Vietnam
20th-century Vietnamese poets
20th-century pseudonymous writers